Collected is a compilation album by British trip hop collective Massive Attack, released on 27 March 2006. The album was preceded by the release of the single "Live with Me" on 13 March. It collects most of the band's singles up until this point.

Track listing

Strings arranged by Craig Pruess (track 7), Wil Malone (track 8), Neil Davidge (track 10), Craig Armstrong (track 13), and Michael Jennings (track 14).

 Tracks 1, 8 and 12 are from Blue Lines
 Tracks 2, 6 and 13 are from Protection
 Tracks 3, 4, 5 and 9 are from Mezzanine
 Tracks 7, 10, 11 are from 100th Window
 Track 14 is a single promoting this compilation
 Tracks 7, 12, 13 are edited versions exclusive to this compilation
 Track 11 is slightly longer than the album version.

Disc two
Some editions of the album come with a bonus Dual Disc. The CD layer features rare material, while the DVD layer comprises all the band's music videos to date. Some editions of this special version, such as the Japanese and Argentinian issues, include, instead of the DualDisc, a second, standard audio CD with the rarities' content of the CD layer of the DualDisc, along with a separate DVD containing the music videos. The Argentinian version DVD (catalogue number 50999 5082759 6, distributed by EMI Odeon) contains the Eleven Promos DVD from 2002 (which corresponds to the first 11 videos of the DVD layer on the DualDisc distributed with other versions).

 Tracks 1, 3 and 6 are previously unreleased
 Track 2 is a remix of "Everywhen" from 100th Window
 Track 4 from Bullet Boy
Track 5 is a new version of "Black Milk" from Mezzanine without Manfred Mann's "Tribute" sample
 Track 7 is a version of "Small Time Shot Away" from 100th Window
 Track 8 from Blade II
 Track 9 from Inner City Blues: The Music of Marvin Gaye
 Track 10 from Unleashed

Credits:
 Robert Del Naja sings on tracks 1, 4, and 7, plays keyboards on tracks 3, 5, and 7, and scratches on track 1.
 Neil Davidge plays keyboards on tracks 1, 3, 4, 5, 7, and 10, guitar on tracks 1, 4, and 6, bass on track 7, and provides backing vocals on track 4.
 Angelo Bruschini plays guitar on tracks 2, 5, and 7.
 Alex Swift plays guitar on track 5 and keyboards on track 7.
 Damon Reece plays drums on tracks 1 and 7.
 Louise Jeffery plays violin on track 6.
 On track 10 collaborated in addition: Craig Pruess (conductor [strings], strings [scored by]), John Baggot (keyboards), Gavyn Wright (orchestra leader), Isobel Griffiths (orchestra [fixer]), Louise Jeffery (piano, strings [additional scoring]), and Stuart Gordon (violin).
Track 1 features a sample from Radiohead's "The Bends" towards the end.

Charts

Weekly charts

Year-end charts

Certifications

References

External links
Collected microsite

Massive Attack albums
2006 compilation albums
Albums produced by Nellee Hooper
2006 video albums
Music video compilation albums
Virgin Records compilation albums
Virgin Records video albums
Albums produced by Neil Davidge